Cecil Joseph Quinlan (4 May 1893 – 23 December 1926) was an Australian rules footballer who played with Melbourne in the Victorian Football League (VFL).

A medical doctor, he died suddenly at age 33 in 1926 in Perth, Western Australia.  His funeral was attended by over 300 people, including the Premier of Western Australia, Philip Collier.

Notes

External links 

1893 births
1926 deaths
Australian rules footballers from Western Australia
Melbourne Football Club players